The National Contest Journal (also referred to by the acronym NCJ) is a bimonthly magazine published by the American Radio Relay League, with an independent volunteer editor.  The magazine covers topics related to amateur radio contesting.  The magazine is published in English and draws its subscription base primarily from the United States of America and Canada.

History
The National Contest Journal was founded by Minnesotan contester Tod Olson, K0TO.  In his editorial for volume 1, issue 1 (January/February, 1973), Olson described the motivational purpose of the publication: "We believe that a genuine desire exists for more information about Radio Contests.  Most of us have an interest in learning about other stations, operators, etc that we find in competition with us."  Olson relied upon the National Traffic System to gather claimed scores in order to print tables of likely competition winners months before the official results were published by the contest sponsors.  Publication for the first three years was done with typewriters and offset printing.  Each issue was 16 pages in 5" x 7.5" format.  After printing, issues were assembled at Olson's home and mailed from a local post office.

Editors
In 50 years of publication, the National Contest Journal has had 17 different editors.  The first editor, and founder of the magazine, was Tod Olson, K0TO.  Olson was one of three editors to have served multiple times in that capacity for the magazine.

Contest sponsorship
The magazine organizes, adjudicates, and publishes the results of two series of annual radio competitions, the North American QSO Party (NAQP) and the North American Sprint.  The NAQP has three separate events (for CW, voice, and RTTY) run twice a year, managed by volunteers.  The Sprint has two separate events (for CW and RTTY) run twice a year, managed by volunteers.  The competitions focus on participation from stations in North America.  The National Contest Journal publishes the contest rules and results in the magazine and on the magazine's web site.

Citations

External links

North American QSO Party
North American Sprint

1973 establishments in Connecticut
Amateur radio magazines
Bimonthly magazines published in the United States
Magazines established in 1973
Magazines published in Connecticut
Radiosport